Greenmount is a rural locality in the Mackay Region, Queensland, Australia.

History 
In 1861 John Mackay (the first British person to explore Mackay area and after whom the city is named) leased a pastoral run which he called Greenmount. In order to meet the government's requirement that the run have stock on it within nine months, he entered into a partnership with James Starr, a squatter from the New England district, and 1200 cattle were on the run by January 1862. However, Starr became insolvent and there was a forced sale of the property in 1863, ending Mackay's association with the Mackay area.

Heritage listings
Greenmount has a number of heritage-listed sites, including:
 Greenmount Road: Greenmount Homestead

Education 
There are no schools in Greenmount. The nearest primary school is in neighbouring Walkerston. The nearest secondary school is Mackay State High School in South Mackay.

References 

Mackay Region
Localities in Queensland